Rally Challenge 2000, released in Japan as Rally '99, is a racing game for the Nintendo 64. It was released in the United States in 2000.

Courses 
Players can race on nine tracks:
 Easy – Australia, Spain, Great Britain
 Medium – Italy, Brazil, France
 Expert – Germany, Canada, US

Cars 
Players can drive these nine cars (all real life):
 Mitsubishi Lancer Evolution IV (Japan)
 Subaru Impreza WRC (Japan)
 Toyota Corolla WRC (Japan)
 Nissan Almera Kit Car (Japan)
 SEAT Córdoba WRC (Spain)
 Škoda Octavia (Czech Republic)
 Volkswagen Golf GTI (Germany)
 Proton Wira (Malaysia)
 Hyundai Coupe Evo II (South Korea)

References 

1999 video games
Nintendo 64 games
Nintendo 64-only games
Genki (company) games
Racing video games set in the United States
Sports video games set in France
Sports video games set in Italy
Video games developed in Japan
Video games set in Canada
Video games set in Japan
Multiplayer and single-player video games
Xicat Interactive games
SouthPeak Games